Poselye is a rural locality (a selo) in Bichursky District, Republic of Buryatia, Russia. The population was 529 as of 2010. There are 6 streets.

Geography 
Poselye is located 28 km east of Bichura (the district's administrative centre) by road. Sloboda is the nearest rural locality.

References 

Rural localities in Bichursky District